Salora International Limited is an Indian conglomerate and the flagship company of the Jiwarajka Group. Their business spans the complete supply chain, and includes logistics, service, manufacturing and distribution.

The company went public in March 1993.

References

Conglomerate companies established in 1968
Companies listed on the Bombay Stock Exchange
Companies listed on the National Stock Exchange of India
New Delhi
1968 establishments in Delhi